Mount Florida railway station is a staffed island platform station on the Cathcart Circle. It serves the Mount Florida and Battlefield areas of Glasgow, Scotland. Services are provided by ScotRail on behalf of Strathclyde Partnership for Transport.

History 

The station opened on 1 March 1886, on the Cathcart District Railway route from Glasgow to Cathcart. The station initially served as a temporary terminal for the route, as the section through to the terminus at Cathcart wasn't completed for a further two months. Another spur at Cathcart laid concurrently also permitted through trains from here towards Neilston and the L&AR terminus at Ardrossan (though only local trains using this route actually stopped here). Regular through trains beyond  on this line ended in July 1932.

Train services were electrified in May 1962, using overhead lines carrying 25 kV AC south of there and 6.25 kV to the north (due to clearance issues - the system was upgraded to 25 kV throughout in 1973).  During the upgrade work, a grade separated junction was installed south of here to reduce conflicting moves between Circle line trains towards Cathcart and those heading for Kirkhill. The island platform layout here allows easy & convenient cross-platform interchange between the two branches to Neilston & Newton and Circle line trains.

Due to its proximity to Hampden Park, the station can be very busy on days where there is a football match or any other event taking place at Hampden. A third platform had been provided on the Inner Circle to the south of the main station opposite the site of the extinct goods yard. This platform was only brought into use during major events and on Wednesdays.

In January 2008, the northern exit from the station was closed whilst disabled access, including a lift, was provided. The stairs reopened in September 2008.

The station has entrances from Battlefield Road, Prospect Hill Road, Bolton Drive, McLennan Street and the campus of Jon Vincent Theatre College, Glasgow.

Services

2016 
A Sunday service is almost the same except the Cathcart Circle trains do not operate. As a result, only three trains per hour operate to Glasgow Central.

During any major event at Hampden Park, Scotrail operate a number of additional services to Mount Florida, running non-stop from Glasgow Central.

References

Notes

Sources 

 
 
 
 

Railway stations in Glasgow
Former Caledonian Railway stations
Railway stations in Great Britain opened in 1886
SPT railway stations
Railway stations served by ScotRail